U.S. Route 51 (US 51) in the U.S. state of Illinois, is a main north–south artery that runs from the Ohio River north to the Wisconsin border, a distance of .

Route description

US 51 enters Illinois from Kentucky at the city town of Cairo, Illinois. The highway remains two lanes wide from Dongola to Assumption with the exception of a  section between Centralia and I-64.

Past Assumption, US 51 becomes an expressway to Decatur. In Decatur, US 51 follows I-72 to bypass the city. US 51 leaves I-72 after , and it heads north to Bloomington–Normal as an expressway.

US 51 follows I-39, intersecting I-80 and I-88 along the way. The highway also follows US 20 south of Rockford (while still following I-39). I-39/US-51 join I-90, making US 51 one of the few toll highways in Illinois that is a U.S. Highway. US 51 exits I-39/I-90 just a mile south of the Wisconsin state line. Then US 51 follows Illinois Route 75 (IL 75) west to the intersection of IL 251, and then turns north through South Beloit, Illinois to enter Wisconsin.

History
US 51 was established in Illinois in the 1920s. Over the years, it became a heavily traveled highway, often experiencing many accidents, particularly in the northern half of the state. This highway gained the moniker of "Killer 51". As a result of these problems, Illinois pushed for a new four lane highway along the corridor. One was proposed in the 1960s and 1970s as part of a proposed supplemental freeway system, but only the area between Rockford and Decatur was given a high priority.

In the 1980s and early 1990s, US 51 was rebuilt to Interstate standards between Rockford and Bloomington–Normal on a new alignment. This new highway became Interstate 39, and US 51 was rerouted onto it. In addition, north of Rockford, US 51 was rerouted onto the existing I-90 segment between South Beloit and Cherry Valley. Most of the old highway became IL 251.

South of Bloomington–Normal to Decatur, US 51 remained largely on the original alignment, and it was expanded to an expressway. In the 2000s, the expressway was continued southward from Decatur to Assumption, Illinois.

Major intersections

References

External links

51
 Illinois
Transportation in Alexander County, Illinois
Transportation in Pulaski County, Illinois
Transportation in Union County, Illinois
Transportation in Jackson County, Illinois
Transportation in Perry County, Illinois
Transportation in Washington County, Illinois
Transportation in Marion County, Illinois
Transportation in Fayette County, Illinois
Transportation in Christian County, Illinois
Transportation in Macon County, Illinois
Transportation in DeWitt County, Illinois
Transportation in McLean County, Illinois
Transportation in Woodford County, Illinois
Transportation in Marshall County, Illinois
Transportation in LaSalle County, Illinois
Transportation in Lee County, Illinois
Transportation in Ogle County, Illinois
Transportation in Winnebago County, Illinois